Bulbinella elegans is a species of plants in the family Asphodelaceae. It is found in the Cape Province of South Africa.

References

External links 

 
 Bulbinella elegans at The Plant List
 Bulbinella elegans at Tropicos

Asphodeloideae
Flora of South Africa
Plants described in 1987
elegans